Euphilotes battoides, the square-spotted blue or buckwheat blue,  is a species of butterfly of the family Lycaenidae. It is found in western North America from California south to Baja California Norte and then west to southern Colorado and New Mexico. This species may also occur in Oregon and Washington, but more study is needed to verify this. 

The wingspan is 16–17 mm. The upperside of the females is brown often with an orange band on the outer edge of the hindwings. Males are blue with dark borders and sometimes an orange band on the outer edge of the hindwings. The underside is off white to grey with black spots. Adults are on wing from mid April to August in one generation per year. They feed on the flower nectar of various plants, but mostly Eriogonum species.

The larvae feed on the flowers and fruits of Eriogonum species. Subspecies battoides has been recorded on Eriogonum lobbii var. lobbii, Eriogonum incanum and Eriogonum polypodum, while subspecies glaucon feeds on Eriogonum umbellatum, Eriogonum ovalifolium var. nivale, Eriogonum heracleoides, Eriogonum sphaerocephalum var. halimioides and Eriogonum flavum var. piperi and subspecies comstocki feeds on Eriogonum umbellatum. Subspecies allyni has been recorded feeding on Eriogonum parvifolium var. parvifolium, records of Eriogonum cinereum and Eriogonum fasciculatum var. fasciculatum are in error, allyni is restricted to E. Parvifolium. The larvae are tended by ants. The species overwinters, in chrysalis, in sand or leaf litter.

Subspecies
E. b. battoides (Behr, 1867) (California)
E. b. comstocki (Shields, 1975)
E. b. centralis (Barnes & McDunnough, 1917) (southern Colorado to northern New Mexico)
E. b. allyni (Shields, 1975) El Segundo blue butterfly (California)
E. b. argocyanea (Pratt and J. Emmel, 1998)
E. b. fusimaculata (Pratt and J. Emmel, 1998)
E. b. mazourka (Pratt and J. Emmel, 1998)
E. b. panamintensis (Pratt and J. Emmel, 1998)
E. b. vernalis (Pratt and J. Emmel, 1998)

Invalid Subspecies
E. b. bernardino (Barnes & McDunnough, 1916) – Bernardino Square-spotted Blue
E. b. centralis (Barnes & McDunnough, 1917)
E. b. glaucon (Edwards, 1871) (British Columbia to northeastern California and southern Idaho)
E. b. intermedia (Barnes & McDunnough, 1917)
E. b. baueri (Shields, 1975)
E. b. ellisi (Shields, 1975)

References

Butterflies described in 1867
Euphilotes
Butterflies of North America
Taxa named by Hans Hermann Behr